Vuti is a village in the province of Mashonaland West, Zimbabwe. It is located about 60 km north-west of Karoi and 10 km east of the Charara Safari Area. Vuti is the location of Vuti Primary School, Vuti High School, a Grain Marketing Board Depot, and a few stores. The village is surrounded by small-scale farms.

References 

Populated places in Mashonaland West Province